Over There is an American action war drama television series co-created by Steven Bochco and Chris Gerolmo and produced by 20th Century Fox Television. It premiered in the United States on July 27, 2005, on FX and in Canada on September 6, 2005, on the History Television channel. The series was presented in 16:9 widescreen format in the United States and the United Kingdom, and mastered in high definition.

FX formally announced on November 1, 2005, that the show would not be returning due to declining ratings. The thirteenth and final episode of the series, "Follow the Money", aired in the United States on October 26, 2005.

Background
The series followed a unit of the United States Army's 3rd Infantry Division on its first tour of duty in Iraq, and chronicled the war's effects on the soldiers' families in the United States. The Iraq sequences were filmed in the California desert, while the homefront scenes are shot in and around the Greater Los Angeles area.

The pilot was developed by Steven Bochco (who also created such acclaimed series as NYPD Blue, L.A. Law and Hill Street Blues). Originally, the show was to be produced by UPN, who subsequently decided that the prospects for international sales were not good and withdrew from the project. However, the series was seen around the world on pay cable channels in about 100 territories, according to Reuters.

The title of the series echoes "Over There", George M. Cohan's 1917 song about U.S. soldiers serving abroad during World War I. The theme song used for the series is Chris Gerolmo's "Over There".

The show (Bochco's first for basic cable) was the first scripted television series set in a current, ongoing military action involving the United States. In another unusual move, the pilot episode was released on DVD on August 2, 2005, less than a week after the show's premiere.

Characters

Main

 PFC Bo "Texas" Rider, Jr. (Josh Henderson) — a  20-year–old star quarterback who was awarded a partial scholarship to Texas A&M, but could not make up the financial shortfall and joined the Army so he could take advantage of the G.I. Bill once his enlistment is up. He was fixated on the nicknames all of his squad mates have and the stories behind them as he did not have his own nickname. He had a wife and young son whom he loved very much. At the end of the first episode, a truck containing Bo and PV2 Dumphy drove over a landmine. Bo received terrible injuries to his leg and it was amputated shortly afterwards. He later became determined to return to his unit to stop feeling helpless.
 PV2 Frank "Dim" Dumphy (Luke Macfarlane) —  in spite of (or, more likely, in reaction against) his well-to-do upbringing and Ivy League education, this 22-year-old Cornell graduate deliberately chose a blue-collar, lower-class lifestyle. He was tormented by intellectual conflicts over the actions he is ordered to carry out, and maddened with worry over his pregnant, alcoholic wife and emotionally disturbed 7-year-old stepson. He has never pursued a commission because he does not want to adopt a leadership role.  His perspective serves as a contrast to emphasize the truly underprivileged roots of his squad mates. Probably the most sensitive character in the series, he was deeply disturbed when he learned that a particular insurgent sacrificed several men and a little girl in order to get past a check point. He lacked a degree of street smarts which "Smoke" possessed as he has shown on some occasions, and does not operate prudently under pressure. It is unclear as to why he is a Private when his B.S. gives him an automatic promotion to Specialist. He carries an M4 carbine like his squad-mates, although his is fitted with an M203 grenade launcher.
 SSG Chris "Scream" Silas (Erik Palladino) — the battle-hardened veteran from Long Island, New York who was given charge of a group of new recruits who has no problem speaking his mind to his superiors. He was not happy about having been handed 90 days additional duty on the eve of returning home, but begins to like his squad more as his 90 days winds down. His nickname, "Scream", stems from the loud manner in which he gives orders.
 PV2 Avery "Angel" King (Keith Robinson) — a gifted singer hailing from a small town in Arkansas, enlisted in a fit of anger at not making a competitive choir, a decision the 20-year–old devout Christian comes to regret. "Angel's" exceptional marksmanship skills made him the unit's Designated Marksman and his M4 having an ACOG mounted on it.
 PV2 Maurice "Smoke" Williams (Kirk "Sticky" Jones) — a native of Compton, California was high during most of his twenty years. Although he was arguably the best in his squad, as evidenced by his street smarts, he had a strictly "us-or-them" attitude towards his white squad mates, but this attitude was lessened each time a white squad mate saves his life. He is irreligious as a rebellion against his mother, and much of his contempt directed toward "Angel". He serves as the squad's SAW gunner, carrying a compact "paratrooper" version of the M249 Squad Automatic Weapon.
 PFC Tariq Nassiri (Omid Abtahi) — is an Arab-American from Detroit who was assigned as a replacement for Bo. His extensive knowledge of Arabic and Middle Eastern customs saved the squad multiple times, acting as a middleman between the American soldiers and the local people. Tariq is college educated and sensitive to all involved. Like Dim, Tariq has a bachelor's degree, yet only held the rank of PFC.
 PFC Esmeralda "Doublewide" Del Rio (Lizette Carrión) — a happily–married new mother, was also a resourceful, no-nonsense soldier. The 20-year–old displayed her whenever the subject of her "ample figure" comes up. She and "Mrs. B" are part of a logistics unit that supports the squad on their missions, be it providing resupply or transport via their M939 5-ton trucks, and also carries an M16A2 rifle instead of an M4 carbine like most of her comrades.
 PV2 Brenda "Mrs. B" Mitchell (Nicki Lynn Aycox) — was a "pig-headed" and obstinate 18-year-old, who was more of a liability than an asset to the squad, and to her partner, "Doublewide." She took great umbrage at the fact that her nickname is short for "Mrs. Bitch." As a teen, she was raped and later gave birth to an autistic child who was put into the custody of his grandparents. Hardships in life made her significantly more willing to risk her life under fire since she seemed to have nothing to lose. She is one of the few characters to carry an M16A2 rifle instead of an M4 carbine, due to her job as part of a support unit instead of a front-line combat unit like her comrades.
 Terry Rider (Sprague Grayden) — Bo's wife who wanted her husband to stay at home after he lost his leg.
 Vanessa Dumphy (Brigid Brannagh) — Frank's wife who ends up cheating on him in the first episode. Throughout the series she displays more and more dysfunction as a result of the lack of stability in their marital status. However, in the final few episodes of the series she attempts to get the marriage back on its feet.
 Sergio Del Rio (Lombardo Boyar) — Esmeralda's husband who throughout the series comes close to cheating on his wife who is overseas while he is also taking care of their son.
 Eddy Dumphy (Jimmy "Jax" Pinchak) — Frank's stepson who simply tried to survive life with his dysfunctional family.

Recurring
 Ana Ortiz – Anna
 Adam Storke — CPT John "Duke" Baron, the team's company commander
 J. Lamont Pope — LT "Mad Cow" Taylor (episodes 1–6), the team's first platoon leader
 Josh Stamberg — LT Alexander "Underpants" Hunter (episodes 7–13), the team's second platoon leader
 Lilly McDowell — Krista
 Kirk B.R. Woller — Dr. Muecke
 Rami Malek — Hassan, an Iraqi insurgent
 Mark-Paul Gosselaar — John Moffet, an American reporter
 Wade Williams — Bo Rider Sr., Bo's estranged father
 David Sullivan — Dr. McGlaglen
 Earl Poitier — Reggie

Guest appearances
 Michael Cudlitz — COL Ryan, an unconventional Army Special Forces officer
 Currie Graham — CPL Shaver, a burned-out medic with a death wish
 Matt Barr – Cracker
 Michael Patrick McGill — Father Feeney
 McKinley Freeman — MDPD Uniform

Episodes

Reception
The show's critics complained that the show "bends over backward not to express any opinion whatsoever about the conflict." Also, given the show's subject matter, it is not surprising that some criticized it as one of the most graphically–violent television programs ever. Accordingly, the program was tagged with the television rating TV-MA for language and violence, and warning notices such as "VIEWER DISCRETION ADVISED." FX advertised the show as being "...TV's most controversial series."

 TV series Over There dramatizes Iraq war article from the July 22, 2005 edition of the Christian Science Monitor.
 "Fighting the Good fight" article from the July 25, 2005 edition of Newsweek.
 "Over There brings the Iraq war home article from the July 26, 2005 issue of USA Today.
 "Over There – Hollywood Joins the War Party" article edited on July 29, 2005 by Antiwar.com.
 "There's Over There — and there's the real thing" article from the August 30, 2005 issue of the San Francisco Chronicle.

Home media
In an unusual move, the pilot episode of the series was released on DVD on August 2, 2005, less than a week after the series' premiere. The complete series was released on DVD in the United States and Canada on March 21, 2006.

References

Further reading

 "Over There is here as series for FX, Bochco" article from the November 2, 2004 issue of The Hollywood Reporter.
 "Britain's Sky One Nabs Bochco War Drama" article from the April 12, 2005 issue of The Hollywood Reporter.
 "Provocative 'Over There' didn't go over big here" article by Bill Keveney in the October 26, 2005 issue of USA TODAY.
 " 'Over There' still top rank" article by David Bianculli in the October 26, 2005 issue of the New York Daily News.
 "FX Withdraws from Over There" as reported on November 1, 2005 by Zap2it.com.
 "FX network ends Iraq war drama Over There" as reported on November 2, 2005 by Reuters.

External links
 
 
 Over There at TV IV
 

2005 American television series debuts
2005 American television series endings
2000s American drama television series
English-language television shows
FX Networks original programming
Iraq War in television
American military television series
Television series by 20th Century Fox Television
Television shows set in Los Angeles
Television series created by Steven Bochco